The 14th Congress of the Philippines (Filipino: Ikalabing-apat na Kongreso ng Pilipinas), composed of the Philippine Senate and House of Representatives, met from July 23, 2007, until June 9, 2010, during the last three years of Gloria Macapagal Arroyo's presidency. The convening of the 14th Congress followed the 2007 general elections, which replaced half of the Senate membership and the entire membership of the House of Representatives. It celebrated the centennial year of the Philippine legislature.

Events

Batasang Pambansa bombing

On the evening of November 17, 2007, an explosion at the South Wing of the Batasang Pambansa Complex killed six people, including Rep. Wahab Akbar (Lakas-CMD, Lone District Basilan). The other fatalities included an aide of Akbar, a driver of  Gabriela Rep. Luzviminda Ilagan, and three aides of Rep. Pryde Henry Teves (Lakas-CMD, 3rd District Negros Oriental). Ten others were injured in the blast, including Reps. Ilagan and Teves.

Arroyo impeachment
On October 5, 2007, Lawyer Robert Pulido filed a three-page impeachment complaint against President Gloria Macapagal Arroyo. This complaint was considered as a ploy by Malacañang according to the opposition. It was only supported by Rep. Edgar S. San Luis (independent, 4th District Laguna). On November 4, the House Committee on Justice, dominated by pro-Arroyo lawmakers, declared as "sufficient in form" the three-page impeachment complaint against President Arroyo. On November 6, the committee then deliberated whether the complaint (due to the National Broadband Network controversy) is "sufficient in substance." If the complaint was declared "sufficient in form", it would be considered as an impeachment proceeding; only one impeachment proceeding is allowed by the constitution, if the committee declares the complaint "insufficient in substance", it would give Arroyo an immunity from impeachment for a year. The committee ultimately voted to trash the complaint, with minority members boycotting the hearing.

Bribery scandal investigation
On November 13, 2007, there was also the Senate's hearing on the bribery scandal that occurred in the presidential palace.

The Manila Peninsula Rebellion

The Manila Peninsula rebellion occurred in the Philippines on November 29, 2007. Detained Senator Antonio Trillanes IV, General Lim and other Magdalo (mutineers) officials walked out of their trial and marched through the streets of Makati, calling for the ouster of President Gloria Macapagal Arroyo, and seizing the second floor of The Peninsula Manila Hotel along Ayala Avenue. Former Vice-president Teofisto Guingona also joined the march to the hotel.

Sen. Antonio Trillanes IV and Brigadier Gen. Danilo Lim surrendered to authorities after an armored personnel carrier rammed into the lobby of the hotel. Director Geary Barias declared that the standoff at the Manila Peninsula Hotel is over as Sen. Antonio Trillanes IV, Brig. Gen. Danilo Lim along with other junior officers agreed to leave the hotel and surrender to Barias after the 6 hour siege. There was difficulty getting out for a while due to the tear gas that was covering the area where they were hiding.

Days after the mutiny, the Makati Regional Trial Court dismissed the rebellion charges against all 14 civilians involved in the siege, and ordered their release.

National Broadband Network Scandal 

The Philippine National Broadband Network controversy is a political affair that centers upon allegations of corruption primarily involving Former Commission on Elections (COMELEC) Chairman Benjamin Abalos, First Gentleman Mike Arroyo and President Gloria Macapagal Arroyo regarding the proposed government-managed National Broadband Network (NBN) for the Philippines and the awarding of its construction to the Chinese firm Zhong Xing Telecommunication Equipment Company Limited (ZTE), a telecommunications and networking equipment provider.

The issue has captivated Filipino politics since it erupted in Philippine media around August 2007, largely through the articles of newspaper columnist Jarius Bondoc of the Philippine Star. It has also taken an interesting turn of events, including the resignation of Abalos as COMELEC chairman, the alleged bribery of congressmen and provincial governors (dubbed as "Bribery in the Palace"), the unseating of Jose de Venecia, Jr. as House Speaker, and the alleged "kidnapping" of designated National Economic and Development Authority (NEDA) consultant-turned-NBN/ZTE witness Rodolfo Noel "Jun" Lozada, Jr.

The Spratly Islands Joint Exploration Agreement 

In connection to the Philippine National Broadband Network controversy, The Joint Marine Seismic Undertaking (JMSU) is a tripartite agreement between the Philippines, China and Vietnam to conduct seismic exploration in an area spanning 142,886 square kilometers west of Palawan. More specifically, it is an agreement between Philippine National Oil Company -Exploration Corporation (PNOC-EC), China National Offshore Oil Corporation (CNOOC) and Vietnam Oil and Gas Corporation (PetroVietnam), that was signed in September 2004 and took effect in July 2005. JMSU has already finished the first phase of the seismic exploration which lasted from September 1 to November 16, 2006, covering 11,000 line kilometers. A Chinese vessel conducted the survey, Vietnam processed the data gathered and this was interpreted by PNOC-EC in Manila. The second phase started in October 2007, covering 11,800 line kilometers. It was supposed to end January 2008.

Charter Change 
Early in 2008, a proposal towards federalism was raised from both members of the Senate and the House of Representatives led by Senator Aquilino Pimentel, Jr. This however was later not pushed through due to President Gloria Macapagal Arroyo personally backing the proposal.
Later on, allies of President Arroyo successfully passed House Resolution 1109 on June 2, 2009, by viva voce in a move to shift the government from the current presidential to parliamentary. All amendments would have needed the approval of three-fourths approval of Congress. The resolution was later shelved by the Senate as it has objected it being passed and due to public outcry towards it.

Sessions
First Regular Session: July 23, 2007 – June 13, 2008
Second Regular Session: July 28, 2008 – June 5, 2009
Third Regular Session: July 27, 2009 – June 9, 2010
First Joint Session: December 9–14, 2009
Second Joint Session: May 24 – June 9, 2010

Legislation
Laws passed by the 14th Congress:

Leadership

Senate
President of the Senate
Manuel Villar (Nacionalista)
Juan Ponce Enrile (PMP),  elected on November 17, 2008

Senate President Pro-Tempore
Jinggoy Estrada (PMP)

Majority Floor Leader
Juan Miguel Zubiri (Lakas–Kampi)

Minority Floor Leader
Aquilino Pimentel, Jr. (PDP–Laban)

House of Representatives
Speaker of the House of Representatives
Jose C. de Venecia, Jr. (Lakas-CMD, 4th District Pangasinan)
Prospero C. Nograles (Lakas–Kampi, 1st District Davao City), elected on February 5, 2008

Deputy Speakers
Luzon:
Arnulfo P. Fuentebella (NPC, 3rd District Camarines Sur)

Central Luzon:
Eric D. Singson (Lakas–Kampi, 2nd District Ilocos Sur)

Visayas:
Raul V. Del Mar (BO-PK/Liberal, 1st District Cebu City)

Central Visayas:
Pablo P. Garcia (One Cebu/Lakas–Kampi, 2nd District Cebu)

Mindanao:
Simeon A. Datumanong (Lakas–Kampi, 2nd District Maguindanao)

Women:
Ma. Amelita C. Villarosa (Lakas–Kampi, Lone District Occidental Mindoro)

Majority Floor Leader
Arthur D. Defensor, Sr. (Lakas–Kampi, 3rd District Iloilo)

Minority Floor Leader
Ronaldo B. Zamora (Nacionalista, Lone District San Juan)

Members

Composition

Senate

Notes

House of Representatives 
The term of office of the House of Representatives is from June 30, 2007, to June 30, 2010.

District representatives 

Notes

Party-list representatives 

Notes

See also
Congress of the Philippines
Senate of the Philippines
House of Representatives of the Philippines

Further reading
Philippine House of Representatives Congressional Library

References

External links

House of Representatives of the Philippines
Philippine Senate

Congresses of the Philippines
Fifth Philippine Republic